Dominican Flag may refer to:

 Flag of the Dominican Republic
 List of Dominican Republic flags
 Flag of Dominica